Ulanqab or Ulan Chab (Ulaɣančab qota; Mongolian cyrillic.Улаанцав хот) is a region administered as a prefecture-level city in south-central Inner Mongolia, China. Its administrative centre is in Jining District, which was formerly a county-level city. It was established as a prefecture-level city on 1 December 2003, formed from the former Ulanqab League.

It borders Hohhot to the west, Mongolia to the north, Xilin Gol League to the northeast, Hebei to the east and Shanxi to the south. As of the 2020 census, its total population was, 1,706,328 inhabitants (2,143,590 in 2010) whom 550,231 inhabitants lived in the built-up (or metro) area made of Jining District and Qahar Right Front Banner largely conurbated in its northern part.

The western part of Ulaan Chab used to be part of the now-defunct Chinese province of Suiyuan.

Administrative subdivisions
Ulaan Chab has eleven administrative divisions: one district, one county-level city, five counties and four banners:

Geography and climate
Ulanqab features a cold semi-arid climate (Köppen BSk), marked by long, cold and very dry winters, warm, somewhat humid summers, and strong winds, especially in spring. More than half of the annual precipitation of around   falls in July and August alone.

Demographics
In the 2000 census, there were 2,284,414 inhabitants:

Transport
Ulanqab's transportation network is well-developed, connected by several railways and highways. Some of the railways the pass through the prefecture are the Beijing−Baotou, Jining−Erlianhot, and the Jining−Tongliao Railways. Major inter-provincial roads include the G6 Beijing–Lhasa Expressway, China National Highway 110 (Beijing to Yinchuan, Ningxia) and 208 (Erlianhot, Inner Mongolia to Changzhi, Shanxi). The city is also served by Ulanqab Jining Airport.

Known people from Ulanqab
He Pingping (1988–2010) was the smallest walking man standing at just 
Guo Shuqing, banker, politician, Governor of Shandong

References

External links
 Official website

 
Cities in Inner Mongolia
Articles containing Mongolian script text
Prefecture-level divisions of Inner Mongolia